Creative Biomart is a New York-based, privately held biotechnology company focused on the development and commercialization of recombinant proteins and protein production.

The company's recombinant protein pipeline includes :

Over 10,000 Recombinant Proteins Database that covers a very comprehensive product lines.
Human recombinant PEDF
Protein production and purification includes Bacterial Expression Systems (E. coli / Bacillus), Cell-Free in Vitro Protein Production, Mammalian Expression Systems (CHO / 293), Yeast Expression Systems, High-throughput Protein Production etc. for high level expression and sample purification.

References

Biotechnology companies of the United States
Pharmaceutical companies of the United States
Health care companies based in New York (state)